Amputee EP is the first release by British rock band Oceansize, and it was released in 1999.  It features early recordings of the songs Amputee and Saturday Morning Breakfast Show, which were featured on the album Effloresce.  The song Heaven Alive was re-recorded for Everyone Into Position, and Ebb was re-recorded as Relapse for the Relapse EP.

Track listing 
1.  Amputee - 5:29 
2.  Saturday Morning Breakfast Show - 7:37 
3.  Ebb - 11:05 
4.  Heaven Alive - 4:47

Personnel 
Mike Vennart - guitar, lead vocals 
Steve Durose - guitar, backing vocals 
Richard "Gambler" Ingram - guitar, keyboards 
Jon Ellis - bass 
Mark Heron - drums

1999 EPs
Oceansize albums